Assam, a state in north eastern India has had a long association with Jainism. Today the state is home to a number of Jain monuments, such as Jain temples and Jain tirths.

History
Surya Pahar in the Goalpara district of Assam has several Jain statues and relics.

One of the oldest Jain temples in Guwahati was established in 1965 in the Fancy Bazar locality.

Community
Jainism is one of the smallest religions in Assam and constitutes 0.09% of the total population. The Government of Assam has officially declared the Jain community in Assam as a minority community.

The Assamese Jain community actively takes part in community service. They regularly organize free health camps.

Major centers

Major ancient Jain centers include:

Sri Surya Pahar

Population by district

See also

Jainism in West Bengal
Jainism in India
Jainism in Tamil Nadu
Jainism in Kerala
Jainism in Bundelkhand

References

Jain communities
Jainism in India
Religion in Assam
History of Assam